You Baby is the second studio album by the American rock band the Turtles. It was released in 1966 on the White Whale Records label. For the album, the group composed much more original material.

Sundazed Records recently licensed the rights to the Turtles' library and has re-released most of the group's early albums.

Track listing
"Flyin' High" (Al Nichol) - 1:47
"I Know That You'll Be There" (P.F. Sloan, Steve Barri) - 2:13
"House of Pain" (Howard Kaylan) - 2:48
"Just a Room" (Steve Duboff, Artie Kornfeld) - 2:30
"I Need Someone" (Chuck Portz, Jim Tucker) - 2:23
"Let Me Be" (P.F. Sloan) - 2:22
"Down in Suburbia" (Bob Lind) - 4:09
"Give Love a Trial" (Ronald Schwartz, Matt Portz) - 2:18
"You Baby" (P.F. Sloan, Steve Barri) - 2:17
"Pall Bearing, Ball Bearing World" (Kaylan) - 2:54
"All My Problems" (Lee Lasseff, Ted Feigin) - 3:15
"Almost There" (Kaylan) - 2:15

Bonus tracks from Sundazed Records CD reissue
"Outside Chance" (Glenn Crocker, Warren Zevon) - 2:08
"Can I Get to Know You Better" (P.F. Sloan, S. Barri) - 2:38

The LP reissue on Rhino Records contains
"You Baby"
"Just a Room"
"I Know That You'll Be There"
"Can I Get to Know You Better"
"Give Love a Trial"
"Almost There"
"Down in Suburbia"
"House of Pain"
"All My Problems"
"Pall Bearing, Ball Bearing World"
"Flyin' High"
"I Need Someone"

For this reissue, Rhino chose to include the non-album single track "Can I Get to Know You Better" in place of "Let Me Be", which had already appeared on the first Turtles album. This change, of course, necessitated an alteration to the front cover artwork, which on the original 1966 LP prominently showcased the inclusion of "Let Me Be".

The CD reissue on Repertoire Records contains
"Flyin' High" (mono) - 1:45
"I Know That You'll Be There" (mono) - 2:14
"House of Pain" (mono) - 2:47
"Just a Room" (mono) - 2:30
"I Need Someone" (mono) - 2:19
"Let Me Be" (mono) - 2:23
"Down in Suburbia" [listed on the sleeve as "Down in Surburbia"] (mono) - 4:06
"Give Love a Trial" (mono) - 2:15
"You Baby" (mono) - 2:15
"Pall Bearing, Ball Bearing World" (mono) - 2:51
"All My Problems" (mono) - 3:14
"Almost There" (mono) - 2:13
"Santa and the Sidewalk Surfer" (Volman, Kaylan, Nichol) (from the album Happy Together Again) - 1:58
"Teardrops" (Stanley, Calhoun, Golder) (from the album Happy Together Again) - 3:02
"Flyin' High" (stereo) - 1:45
"I Know That You'll Be There" (stereo) - 2:14
"House of Pain" (stereo) - 2:47
"Just a Room" (stereo) - 2:30
"I Need Someone" (stereo) - 2:19
"Let Me Be" (stereo) - 2:23
"Down in Suburbia" [listed on the sleeve as "Down in Surburbia"] (stereo) - 4:06
"Give Love a Trial" (stereo) - 2:15
"You Baby" (stereo) - 2:15
"Pall Bearing, Ball Bearing World" (stereo) - 2:51
"All My Problems" (stereo) - 3:14
"Almost There" (stereo) - 2:13

Personnel
Howard Kaylan - keyboards, vocals
Al Nichol - bass guitar, guitar, keyboards, vocal harmony
Mark Volman - guitar, tambourine, vocals
Chuck Portz - bass guitar
Jim Tucker - rhythm guitar
Dwight Tunji Trio - percussion, special effects
Don Murray - drums

Charts

Billboard Hot 100:
 You Baby- No. 20
Let Me Be- No. 29
 Can I Get To Know You Better- No. 89

References

The Turtles albums
1966 albums
Albums produced by Bones Howe
White Whale Records albums
Sundazed Records albums